Group B of the 2021 Africa Cup of Nations took place from 10 to 18 January 2022. The group consisted of Guinea, Malawi, Senegal and Zimbabwe.

Senegal and Guinea as the top two teams, along with Malawi as one of the four best third-placed teams, advanced to the round of 16.

Teams

Notes

Standings

Matches

Senegal vs Zimbabwe

Guinea vs Malawi

Senegal vs Guinea

Malawi vs Zimbabwe

Malawi vs Senegal

Zimbabwe vs Guinea

References

External links
 

2021 Africa Cup of Nations